Natività di Gesù is a church on Piazza Pasquino in the Parione rione of Rome. It is the national church in Rome of the Democratic Republic of Congo.

It was built at the end of the 17th century for the Archconfraternity of the Company of the Nativity (known as the Agonizzanti), formed in 1616. Pope Innocent XII granted a letter giving the Archconfraternity the licence to build a church as its oratory. It was rebuilt several times, the last being in 1862, when it took on its current appearance.

External links 
 Mariano Armellini, Le chiese di Roma dal secolo IV al XIX, Roma 1891
 C. Hulsen, Le chiese di Roma nel Medio Evo, Firenze 1927
 F. Titi, Descrizione delle Pitture, Sculture e Architetture esposte in Roma, Roma 1763

Bibliography 

 C. Rendina, Le Chiese di Roma, Newton & Compton Editori, Milano 2000, p. 266
 G. Carpaneto, Rione VI Parione, in AA.VV, I rioni di Roma, Newton & Compton Editori, Milano 2000, Vol. II, pp. 384–447

National churches in Rome
Churches of Rome (rione Parione)